"Retreat! Retreat!" is the first single by the English instrumental post rock band 65daysofstatic, released on 29 November 2004 on Monotreme.

Overview
The distinctive sample that opens "Retreat! Retreat!" ("This negative energy just makes me stronger, we will not retreat, this band is unstoppable!") is the voice of Matt Dillon from the 1992 film Singles.

The music video for "Retreat! Retreat!" was produced by Media Lounge.

An unusual time signature 10/4 is used in the middle of the song.

Track listing
"Retreat! Retreat!" – 4:09
"AOD" – 6:15 different version from Stumble.Stop.Repeat (EP)
"The Major Cities of the World Are Being Destroyed One By One By the Monsters" – 4:09

External links
 

2004 singles
65daysofstatic songs
2004 songs